Bent Hindrup Andersen (born 1943) is a Danish politician. He was elected to parliament for the Red–Green Alliance (Denmark) 21 September 1994. He was a member until the 10 March 1998.

On 1 March 2003 he became a member of the European Parliament for the June Movement after Jens Okking (People's Movement against the EU, originally elected for the June Movement) resigned and sat until 19 July 2004.

References

1943 births
Living people
People from Gentofte Municipality
Members of the Folketing
People's Movement against the EU MEPs
MEPs for Denmark 1999–2004